Mayiik Ayii Deng is a South Sudanese politician and Minister of Foreign Affairs and International Cooperation, He was appointed into the office following Republican decree by the President removing Beatrice Khamisa Wani in September 2021. He had also served as the Minister of presidential affairs in the Revitalized Transitional Government of National Unity (R-TGoNU). Mr. Deng was appointed minister in the Office of the President on 29 April 2016, following the signing of the Agreement on the Resolution of Conflict in the Republic of South Sudan (ARCISS) and the formation of the transitional Government of National Unity (TGoNU, a position he held until he was reappointed as Minister of Presidential Affairs in March 2020 and subsequently relieved in June 2020 in that latest position

Mr. Deng participated in the South Sudan peace process in various capacities since independence in 2011. He was part of the SPLM negotiating team in Arusha, Tanzania in 2014 during the negotiation of SPLM Reunification.

Early life and education
Mr. Mayiik Ayii Deng was born on 20 December 1971 in what was then the Bahr el Ghazal Province in Sudan and now South Sudan. He has professional training in International Relations and diplomacy. He holds a Bachelor of Arts Degree in Political Science and History from Loras College in Dubuque, Iowa. and Masters of Arts in Management (IP) from Saint Mary's University in Minneapolis, Minnesota.

Career
Prior to joining the Office of the President of the Republic of South Sudan as the Minister in the Office of the President, Mr. Deng was an active basketball player. He went to the United States of America in the 1990s under the US High School Basketball scholarship program where he joined Winston – Salem State University in North Carolina while at the same time played in numerous inter-estates basketball competitions.
Mr. Deng is also a member of parliament (MP) in the South Sudan Transitional National Legislative Assembly (TNLA) representing Tonj North constituency in Warrap State on the SPLM Party List ticket.

Gallery

See also
 SPLM
 SPLA
 Cabinet of South Sudan

References

External links
Website of Government of South Sudan

 Living people
 Government ministers of South Sudan
 Members of the National Legislative Assembly (South Sudan)
1971 births